Edwin Stevens Lines (November 23, 1845 – October 25, 1927) was a bishop of the Episcopal Diocese of Newark, New Jersey.

Biography
Lines was born in Naugatuck, Connecticut on November 23, 1845, the son of Henry Willis Lines and Harriet Bunnell. He studied at Yale Divinity School between 1872 and 1873 and later graduated from Berkeley Divinity School in 1874.

Ordained Ministry
He was ordained deacon on May 24, 1874 in Middletown, Connecticut and became rector of Christ Church in West Haven, Connecticut. He was ordained priest in the same church on December 21, 1874 and remained rector till 1879 when he became rector of St Paul's Church in New Haven, Connecticut.

Bishop
Lines was elected on the fifth ballot as Bishop of Newark on June 17, 1903 and was consecrated on November 18, 1903 by Presiding Bishop Daniel S. Tuttle. He died in office on October 25, 1927 due to heart failure.

Family
Lines married in Mary Louise Morehouse on May 4, 1880 and together had four children.

References

1845 births
1927 deaths
Episcopal bishops of Newark
Psi Upsilon